Zea diploperennis, the diploperennial teosinte, is a species of grass (family: Poaceae) in the genus Zea and a teosinte (wild relative of maize or corn). It is perennial.

Conservation
Virtually all populations of this teosinte are either threatened or endangered: Z. diploperennis exists in an area of only a few square miles. The Mexican and Nicaraguan governments have taken action in recent years to protect wild teosinte populations, using both in situ and ex situ conservation methods. Currently, a large amount of scientific interest exists in conferring beneficial teosinte traits, such as insect resistance, perennialism, and flood tolerance, to cultivated maize lines, although this is very difficult due to linked deleterious teosinte traits. Researchers are studying Z. diploperennis as its genes provide resistance against Striga, which can decrease grain yield.

References

External links 

diploperennis
Grasses of Mexico
Grasses of North America
Flora of Central America
Flora of Jalisco
Plants described in 1979